Bindra is a Punjabi surname found among Khatris and Jats. Many Bindra Khatris were located in Rawalpindi district.

Notable people
Notable people with the surname, who may or may not be affiliated with the clan/religion, include:
Abhinav Bindra, Indian sports shooter
Dalbir Bindra, Canadian psychologist
Dolly Bindra, Indian actress
Ishar Bindra 
Jagjeet (Jeet) S. Bindra
Mahesh Bindra, New Zealand politician
Prerna Singh Bindra, Indian environmental journalist
Satinder Bindra

References 

Indian surnames
Surnames of Indian origin
Punjabi-language surnames
Hindu surnames
Khatri clans
Khatri surnames